Hana Vítová (24 January 1914 – 3 March 1987) was a Czechoslovak film actress. She appeared in more than 50 films between 1931 and 1965. In Germany she was billed as Hanna Witt.

Selected filmography
 Paradise Road (1936)
 Lidé na kře (1937)
 The Merry Wives (1938)
 A Foolish Girl (1938)
 Jiný vzduch (1939)
 Nocturnal Butterfly (1941)
 Valentin the Good (1942)
 The Second Shot (1943)
 Happy Journey (1943)
 Spring Song (1944)
 Saturday (1945)
 Sign of the Anchor (1947)
 The Poacher's Foster Daughter or Noble Millionaire (1949)
 The House in Karp Lane (1965)

References

External links
 

1914 births
1987 deaths
Czech film actresses
Actresses from Prague
20th-century Czech actresses